Gloria Taylor (1950 – 7 April 2008) was a Nigerian activist whose 10-year-old son, Damilola Taylor, was brutally attacked and murdered by two youths in a vicious attack at the North Peckham Estate of South London in November 2000. Her son's murder called attention to social and economic crises in the UK's poorer inner city neighborhoods.

Taylor later worked as an activist following her son's murder stating that she wanted to provide opportunities for Britain's  "downtrodden and underprivileged youth." Taylor and her husband, Richard Taylor, established the Damilola Taylor Trust, with the financial support of politicians and celebrities such as soccer player Rio Ferdinand.

References

External links 
 Damilola Taylor Trust
 The Guardian: Damilola Taylor's mother dies
 The Telegraph: Gloria Taylor obituary
 The Telegraph: Damilola Taylor's mother Gloria dies
 The Times: Damilola Taylor’s mother dies of a heart attack

1950 births
2008 deaths
British activists
British women activists
English people of Nigerian descent
Date of birth missing
Place of birth missing